The Stockholm Marathon, known as the adidas Stockholm Marathon for sponsorship reasons, is an annual marathon arranged in Stockholm, Sweden, since 1979. It serves as the Swedish marathon championship race. At the 2009 Stockholm Marathon more than 18,500 participants (14,442 men and 4,385 women) were registered.  The marathon is categorized as a Bronze Label Road Race by World Athletics.

Course 

The marathon starts adjacent to the 1912 Olympic Stadium and consists of two loops around the city, finishing with a three-quarter lap around the tracks of the Olympic Stadium. Until and including the 2009 edition, the two loops around the city differed only slightly from each other, but the major part of the loops were identical. However, from 2010 the route was changed somewhat to make the loops more different from each other. Most notably, the first loop is now shorter, thus minimizing the number of trailing runners that the elite runners have to lap.

Date 
The marathon normally takes place at the end of May or the beginning of June. It is held on a Saturday afternoon, thus distinguishing it from the majority of city marathons (London, New York, Paris) which take place on Sunday mornings, to minimise disruption to the city.

The 2020 edition of the race was cancelled due to the coronavirus pandemic. The 2021 competition was postponed as well, and ended up held on Saturday, 9 October.

Reception 
The book The Ultimate Guide to International Marathons ranks the Stockholm Marathon as the best marathon in the world.

Winners
In the case of Swedish runners, the runner's club is also mentioned.
Key:

Men

Women

Notes

References

List of winners 
 Heyworth, Malcolm & Fält, Birger (8 June 2009). Stockholm Marathon. Association of Road Racing Statisticians. Retrieved on 27 May 2011.

External links 

 Official website (in english)
 Marathon Info profile
 Stockholm Marathon at SVT's open archive 

Marathons in Sweden
International sports competitions in Stockholm
1979 establishments in Sweden
Recurring sporting events established in 1979
Summer events in Sweden
International athletics competitions hosted by Sweden